Gelechia bergiella is a moth of the family Gelechiidae first described by Karl August Teich in 1886. It is found in Lithuania.

References

Moths described in 1886
Gelechia